The Littleton Formation is a geologic formation in New Hampshire. It preserves fossils dating back to the Devonian period. The formation is exposed on several of New Hampshire's most prominent mountains, including Mount Washington and the northern Presidential Range, Mount Moosilauke, and Mount Monadnock.

See also

 List of fossiliferous stratigraphic units in New Hampshire
 Paleontology in New Hampshire

References

 

Devonian geology of New Hampshire
Geologic formations of New Hampshire
Devonian southern paleotemperate deposits